The 24th Goya Awards were given in 2010 to honour the best in Spanish filmmaking of 2009.

Cell 211 won the award for Best Film.

Winners and nominees

Major awards

Other award nominees

Honorary Goya
 Antonio Mercero

References

24
2009 film awards
2009 in Spanish cinema
2010 in Madrid